Doyle's Delight is the highest peak in Belize at . It lies on the Maya Divide, the main ridge line of the Maya Mountains in southwestern Belize.

The name Doyle's Delight was first coined by Sharon Matola in a 1989 report. The name is based on Sir Arthur Conan Doyle's book The Lost World (1912), which contains the quote "there must be something wild and wonderful in a country such as this, and we're the men to find it out!".

This name has meanwhile achieved widespread acceptance. The official Government of Belize Website lists Doyle's Delight as the highest point in Belize. The capital of Belize, Belmopan, has a "Doyle's Delight Street". Recently there has been an attempt to rename the peak to "Kaan Witz" which is Maya for "Sky Mountain", but the new name has not gained widespread acceptance.

Victoria Peak is located east of the Maya Mountain Divide in the Stann Creek District, and in clear weather its dramatic peak is visible from the coast. Doyle's Delight is located in the heart of the Maya Mountains and is part of a more gently sloping range, with no dramatic peak.

Expeditions
There is a clearing on the peak that is maintained by the Belize Defence Force and the British Military as a helicopter landing.  In 1970, a survey marker was placed at the high point of the ridge.

In 2004 and 2007 ecologists reached the summit by using a helicopter and surveyed Doyle's Delight and adjacent ridges to better understand the ecology and biodiversity of the region.  These efforts focused on plants, fungi, insects, amphibians, birds, and small mammals, and produced preliminary inventory data for the area.

Two notable expeditions by mountaineers, in 2007 and 2008, reached the summit by hiking and climbing for eight days through the virgin jungle. The second expedition members included: Bruno Kuppinger (Germany), Christian Rodriguez (Guatemala), Douglas Leonardo (Guatemala), Emilino Sho (Belize), Alfredo, and Erick Cho (Belize).

References

External links
 Ascenso a la cima Doyle’s Delight, el punto más alto de Belice

Mountains of Belize
Cayo District
Highest points of countries